A joystick is a control device.

Joystick may also refer to:

Side-stick, a flight control device
Centre stick, a flight control device

Music 
"Joystick", a 1964 single by The Tornados
Joystick, a 1983 single by the Dazz Band
Joystick, a 1983 album by the Dazz Band
Joystick, a 2002 album by Rockbot
"Joystick" (song), a 2010 song by Simon Curtis from the album 8Bit Heart

Other 
Joystick (comics), a fictional character in the Marvel Comics universe
Joysticks (film), a 1983 comedy about a video arcade
Joystiq, a video game website
Joystick (magazine), a French magazine
Slang for penis, the primary sexual organ of male animals